Symmoca tofosella is a moth of the family Autostichidae. It is found in Portugal, Spain and Italy.

The wingspan is about 16 mm. The ground colour of the forewings is brownish grey, dusted with whitish scales along the margin. The hindwings are brownish grey.

References

External links
Images representing Symmoca tofosella  at Consortium for the Barcode of Life

Moths described in 1893
Symmoca
Moths of Europe